Charles Robert Ashbee (17 May 1863 – 23 May 1942) was an English architect and designer who was a prime mover of the Arts and Crafts movement, which took its craft ethic from the works of John Ruskin and its co-operative structure from the socialism of William Morris.

Ashbee was defined by one source as "designer, architect, entrepreneur, and social reformer". His disciplines included metalwork, textile design, furniture, jewellery and other objects in the Modern Style (British Art Nouveau style) and Arts and Crafts genres. He became an elected member of the Art Workers' Guild in 1892, and was elected as its Master in 1929.

Early life
Ashbee was born in 1863 in Isleworth, then just West of the Victorian sprawl of London and now a suburb. He was the first child and only son of businessman Henry Spencer Ashbee, the senior partner in the London branch of the firm of Charles Lavy & Co., and Elizabeth Jenny Lavi (1842–1919), daughter of his German business partner. His parents had married in Elizabeth's hometown of Hamburg, Germany on 27 June 1862. His mother's brother Charles Lavy (1842-1928) inherited the German firm and became a politician.

Charles Robert had three sisters Frances Mary (1866–1926), Agnes Jenny (1869–1926) and Elsa (1873–1944) Family life was not happy. As the father became more conservative, his family followed the progressive movement of the era. "The 'excessive education' of his daughters irritated him, his Jewish wife's pro-suffragism infuriated him, and he became estranged from his socialist homosexual son, Charles". Henry Spencer was, like his son after him, well travelled and a writer. He also became a notable erotic bibliophile.

Charles Robert Ashbee went to Wellington College and read History at King's College, Cambridge, from 1883 to 1886, and studied under the architect George Frederick Bodley.

Henry and Elisabeth separated in 1893.

Guild and School of Handicraft

Ashbee set up his Guild and School of Handicraft in 1888 in London, while a resident at Toynbee Hall, one of the original settlements set up to alleviate inner city poverty, in this case, in the slums of Whitechapel. The fledgling venture was first housed in temporary space but by 1890 had workshops at Essex House, Mile End Road, in the East End, with a retail outlet in the heart of the West End in fashionable Brook Street, Mayfair, more accessible to the Guild's patrons. The School closed in 1895, which Ashbee blamed on "the failure of the Technical Education Board of the L.C.C. to keep its word with the School Committee and the impossibility of carrying on costly educational work in the teeth of state aided competition." The following year the L.C.C. opened the Central School of Arts and Crafts. 

One of Ashbee's pupils in Mile End was Frank Baines, later Sir Frank, who was enormously influential in keeping Arts and Crafts alive in 20th-century architecture.

In 1902 the Guild moved to Chipping Campden, in the Gloucestershire Cotswolds, where a sympathetic community provided local patrons, but where the market for craftsman-designed furniture and metalwork was saturated by 1905. The Guild was liquidated in 1907. 

The Guild of Handicraft specialised in metalworking, producing jewellery and enamels as well as hand-wrought copper and wrought ironwork, and furniture. (A widely illustrated suite of furniture was made by the Guild to designs of M. H. Baillie Scott for Ernest Louis, Grand Duke of Hesse at Darmstadt.) The School attached to the Guild taught crafts. The Guild operated as a co-operative, and its stated aim was to:

Ashbee himself often designed objects to be made of silver and other metals: belt buckles, jewellery, cutlery and tableware, for example.

Architecture and design in Europe

As an architect, he was willing to do complete house design, including interior furniture and decoration, as well as items such as fireplaces. In the 1890s he renovated The Wodehouse near Wombourne in Staffordshire for Colonel Thomas Shaw-Hellier, commandant of the Royal Military School of Music, adding a billiard room and chapel, amid many external changes. Shaw-Hellier commissioned him in 1907 to build the Villa San Giorgio in Taormina, Sicily, as a little island of England in Italy, hence the name of the patron saint (see History of Taormina). His biographer Fiona MacCarthy judges it "the most impressive of Ashbee's remaining buildings"; it is run as the Hotel Ashbee.

He also designed buildings in Budapest and London, including several studios in Cheyne Walk, Chelsea and his own family home at 37 Cheyne Walk.

Survey of London
Ashbee also founded the Survey of London. The Oxford Reference (Oxford University Press) provides this summary: "Mindful of the huge losses of historic buildings through redevelopment, he began a process of surveying London buildings that led to the important Survey of London volumes."

Book author and publisher
Ashbee was involved in book production and literary work. He set up the Essex House Press after Morris's Kelmscott Press closed in 1897, taking on many of the displaced printers and craftsmen. Between 1898 and 1910 the Essex House Press produced more than 70 titles. Ashbee designed two type faces for the Press,  (1901) and Prayer Book (1903), both of which are based on Morris's Golden Type.

In 1906, Ashbee published "A Book of Cottages and Little Houses" and, in 1909, "Modern English Silverwork".

In 1924, after concluding a job as civic advisor to the city of Jerusalem, Ashbee wrote a report titled Jerusalem, 1920-1922, Being the Records of the Pro-Jerusalem Council During the First Two Years of the Civil Administration. 

Ashbee wrote two utopian novels influenced by Morris, From Whitechapel to Camelot (1892) and The Building of Thelema (1910), the latter named after the abbey in François Rabelais' book Gargantua and Pantagruel.

Jerusalem (1918–1923)

In 1918 Ashbee was appointed civic adviser to the British Administration for Palestine, within the Occupied Enemy Territory Administration, later Mandatory Palestine, overseeing building works and the protection of historic sites and monuments as the chairman of the Pro-Jerusalem Society. His official title was Honorary Secretary to the Council, which was the leading board of the Society. He summoned his family to Jerusalem, where they lived until 1923.

Ashbee served as Civic Adviser to the City of Jerusalem (1919-1922) and as a professional adviser to the Town Planning Commission. Described as "the most pro-Arab and anti-Zionist" of the six British planners, Ashbee's view of the city "was colored by a romantic sense of the vernacular." Aiming to protect this Palestinian vernacular and the city's secular and traditional fabric, Ashbee oversaw conservation and repair work in the city, and revived the craft industry there to repair the damaged Dome of the Rock.

Personal life
Ashbee has been described by as "half-Jewish, Anglican, bisexual, married, Socialist, conservationist, romantic, rebel, fop, and self-described "practical idealist"".

Ashbee was homosexual at a time when sex between men was a criminal offence. He is thought to have been a member of the Order of Chaeronea, a secret society founded in 1897 by the poet and penal reformer George Ives for the cultivation of a homosexual ethos. He certainly belonged to groups that provided support and understanding to homosexuals.

In 1898, seemingly to cover his homosexuality, Ashbee married the daughter of a wealthy London stockbroker, Janet Elizabeth Forbes (1877–1961), to whom he admitted his sexual orientation soon after she accepted his proposal. During thirteen years of rocky marriage, which included a serious affair of his wife's, they had four children: Mary, Helen, Prudence, and Felicity. Mary Ashbee, later Ames-Lewis (1911–2004) was born at Chipping Campden; Jane Felicity Ashbee (1913–2008), Helen Christabel Ashbee, later Cristofanetti (1915–1998) and Prudence Margaret Ashbee (1917–1979) were all born at Broad Campden.

Ashbee was influenced in his life by the theories of homosexuality developed by Edward Carpenter.

Death
Ashbee died in 1942 at Sevenoaks and was buried at St Peter and St Paul's Church in Seal, Kent, where he was church architect. The internal screen for the church tower was designed by Ashbee.

Personal archive and legacy
His papers and journals are at King's College, Cambridge. Ashbee's unpublished personal memoirs, all 7 volumes, are held at the London Library.

The East End Preservation Society has presented an annual CR Ashbee Memorial Lecture since 2015:

2015 - Oliver Wainwright on the Seven Dark Arts of Developers
2016 - Rowan Moore on The Future of London
2017 - Maria Brenton, Rachel Bagenal and Kareem Dayes on Hope in the Housing Crisis.
2018 - The Gentle Author of the Spitalfields Life blog on CR Ashbee in the East End.

See also
 Birmingham Guild and School of Handicrafts, which was modelled on Ashbee's Guild and School of Handicraft.
 Clifford Holliday, town planner and architect, followed Ashbee in Palestine (1922-1935)
 Ernest Tatham Richmond, British architect, Consulting Architect to the Haram ash-Sharif (1918–20)

References

Further reading
Crawford, A. 1986. C.R. Ashbee, Architect, Designer & Romantic Socialist (Yale University Press)
Fiona MacCarthy. 1981. Simple Life: C.R. Ashbee in the Cotswolds (University of California Press)

External links

Victorian Web: C. R. Ashbee, an overview
Charles Robert Ashbee on-line; guide to illustrations
Court Barn Museum in Chipping Camden: Life and works of Ashbee and other members of the Guild

1863 births
1942 deaths
Alumni of King's College, Cambridge
Arts and Crafts architects
Arts and Crafts movement artists
Administrators of Palestine
Architects in Mandatory Palestine
English businesspeople
English graphic designers
19th-century English novelists
20th-century English novelists
English printers
English socialists
English gay artists
English gay writers
English LGBT novelists
English LGBT businesspeople
Gay novelists
Gay businessmen
People educated at Wellington College, Berkshire
Architects from London
Private press movement people
Masters of the Art Worker's Guild
19th-century English LGBT people
20th-century English LGBT people